The Way of a Serpent is a 1982 novel by Swedish author Torgny Lindgren.

A film adaption by Bo Widerberg, The Serpent's Way, was made in 1986.

References

1982 Swedish novels
Swedish-language novels
Novels set in Västerbotten